Billy Treacy (birth unknown), also known by the nickname of "Billy Whizz", is an Irish rugby league footballer who played in the 2000s. He played at representative level for Ireland, and at club level in the Irish Elite League for the Treaty City Titans (in Limerick).

Background
Billy Treacy was born in Ireland.

Playing career
He was named in the Ireland training squad for the 2008 Rugby League World Cup.

References

External links
Ireland 58-18 Russia
Wales A 10 Ireland A 24
(archived by web.archive.org) Treaty City Titans profile
Photograph of Billy Treacy

Living people
Irish rugby league players
Ireland national rugby league team players
Rugby league players from County Limerick
Year of birth missing (living people)